Channel 4 Learning is an education company based in London, England. The company markets education resources, games and activities to primary and secondary schools across the United Kingdom. It is wholly owned by Espresso Group Ltd.

History 
Channel 4 Learning, originally part of Channel 4, was created to produce support materials that motivate and inspire learners aged 4–19 while empowering teachers to create engaging lessons.

Primary resources cover Early Years, Key Stage 1 and Key Stage 2. Secondary resources cover Key Stage 3, Key Stage 4 and GCSEs.

In October 2007, Channel 4 launched Learning Clipbank, an online service specifically for secondary schools in the UK, providing video clips across 16 subject areas with tools to assist teachers and students in using the content. While most of the video was originally sourced from Channel 4 television programmes, it has since been supplemented with content from ITN and BBC Motion Gallery.

Channel 4 Learning also has an International division that license and distributes the rights to over 320 hours of educational programming, commissioned by Channel 4, into more than 40 countries worldwide.

After the re-structuring of Channel 4 in 1993, ITV's obligations to provide educational programming on Channel 4's airtime passed to Channel 4 itself, and the new service became Channel 4 Schools, with the new corporation administering the service and commissioning its programmes, some still from ITV, others from independent production.

In 2000, the service was renamed 4Learning and in April 2007, the commercial arm and rights exploitation of its programmes and support materials was sold to Espresso Education and renamed Channel 4 Learning.

References

External links
 

British companies established in 2007
Channel 4
Educational broadcasting in the United Kingdom
Education companies of the United Kingdom